KYBY-LP (103.5 FM) is a terrestrial American low power radio station, licensed to Montgomery, Montgomery County, Texas, United States, and is owned by Backyard Radio, Inc. of Montgomery, Texas.

History
Backyard Radio, Inc. received a construction permit to build a Class L1 (low power) facility off of Kelly Road, north of Farm to Market Road 1774 in Magnolia, Texas, on January 16, 2014. The facility is authorized to operate at 100 watts ERP, from an elevation of 26.2309 meters height above average terrain.

The construction permit was assigned the call letters KYBY-LP on February 1, 2014. The callsign stands for BackYard Radio, the station's branding, as well as the Company name of the owner.

KYBY-LP received an initial License to Cover on November 10, 2014.

References

External links

YBY-LP
YBY-LP
Radio stations established in 2014